The Sŭngri Line is a non-electrified  long railway line of the Korean State Railway in North Korea, connecting Sŏnbong on the Hambuk Line with the industrial area at Sŭngri.

The line serves the large Sŭngri Petrochemical Complex in Sŭngri.

Route 

A yellow background in the "Distance" box indicates that section of the line is not electrified.

References

Railway lines in North Korea
Standard gauge railways in North Korea